Scampi, also called Dublin Bay Prawn or Norway Lobster (Nephrops norvegicus), is an edible lobster of the order Decapoda. It is widespread in the Mediterranean and northeastern Atlantic, from North Africa to Norway and Iceland, and is a gastronomic delicacy. Scampi became the only species in the genus Nephrops after several other species were moved to the closely related genus Metanephrops.

The term Scampi (sometimes Shrimp Scampi, particularly in the United States) is used for a food that includes various preparations of certain crustaceans, such as Metanephrops, as well as shrimp or prawns. Scampi preparation styles vary regionally. The United Kingdom legally defines scampi specifically as Nephrops norvegicus. Monkfish tail was formerly sometimes used and sold as scampi in the United Kingdom, contravening the Fish Labelling (Amendment) England Regulation 2005 and Schedule 1 of the Food Labelling Regulations 1996.

Name

The Italian word may be derived from the Greek καμπή kampē ("bending" or "winding").

Nephrops norvegicus
Norwegian lobsters are also known as Dublin Bay prawns. The term prawn can be confusing as it is a vernacular or colloquial term that has no clearly defined scientific meaning—see Shrimp versus prawn.

The food labelling laws (in Britain, for example) define "scampi" as Nephrops norvegicus.
In the UK, it is generally known by its common name, the Langoustine.

Preparation methods

According to the French encyclopaedia Larousse Gastronomique, langoustine are delicate and need to be poached only for a few seconds in court-bouillon. When very fresh, they have a slightly sweet flavour that is lost when frozen. They can be eaten plain, accompanied by melted butter.

In Britain, the shelled tail meat is generally referred to as "scampi tails" or "wholetail scampi", although cheaper "re-formed scampi" can contain other parts together with other fish. It is served fried in batter or breadcrumbs and usually with chips and tartar sauce. It is widely available in supermarkets and restaurants and considered pub or snack food, although factors reducing Scottish fishing catches (such as bad weather) can affect its availability.

In the United States, "shrimp scampi" is the menu name for shrimp in Italian-American cuisine (the actual word for "shrimp" in Italian is gambero or gamberetto, plural gamberi or gamberetti).  "Scampi" by itself is a dish of Nephrops norvegicus served in garlic butter, dry white wine and Parmesan cheese, either with bread or over pasta or rice, or sometimes just the shrimp alone. The term "shrimp scampi" is construed as a style of preparation, with variants such as "chicken scampi", "lobster scampi", and "scallop scampi".

As an alternative seafood
Owing to the decline of fish stocks, British chefs including Heston Blumenthal and Hugh Fearnley-Whittingstall launched a "Fish Fight" campaign in 2010, attempting to raise awareness of alternative seafoods. They championed scampi and other lesser-known seafood dishes as a more sustainable source of protein.

National Shrimp Scampi Day
In the United States, National Shrimp Scampi Day occurs annually on April 29.

See also
 List of seafood dishes

References

Further reading
 Alan Davidson, Mediterranean Seafood, 1972. .
 Prosper Montagné, Larousse Gastronomique, 1938. .

External links 
 

American cuisine
Animal-based seafood
European cuisine
Seafood dishes
Shrimp dishes